Martin Kraus may refer to:

 Martin Kraus (footballer, born 1992), Czech footballer for Vlašim
 Martin Kraus (footballer, born 1993), Austrian footballer for Wiener Sport-Club

See also
 Joseph Martin Kraus (1756-1792), German-born Swedish composer
 Martin Krause (1853–1918), German concert pianist
 Martin Krause (mathematician) (1851–1920), German mathematician